Einar Hærland (3 January 1909 – 12 June 1944) was a Norwegian military officer who was executed during the occupation of Norway by Nazi Germany.

He was born in Solum as the son of Ole Hærland and his wife Marie, née Knudsen. Einar Hærland married and had two children, and the family settled in Oslo.

Hærland had embarked on a military career, and was promoted to Captain following the battles in Northern Norway during the Norwegian Campaign. When the fighting subsided, and Germany occupied Norway, he was hired in the police, while at the same time conducting illegal resistance work. When the Nazi police leader Gunnar Lindvig was assassinated by the Norwegian resistance in May 1944, Hærland was executed by Sicherheitspolizei officer Ernst Weiner as a reprisal. His execution marked the start of a broader retaliation operation called Operation Blumenpflücken. Hærland was buried at Vestre gravlund.

Comedian Anne-Kat Hærland is Einar Hærlands granddaughter

References

1909 births
1944 deaths
Executed Norwegian people
Executed military personnel
Norwegian Army personnel of World War II
Norwegian military personnel killed in World War II
Norwegian police officers
Resistance members killed by Nazi Germany
Burials at Vestre gravlund
Deaths by firearm in Norway
People executed by Germany by firearm
Norwegian people executed by Nazi Germany